Castle Peak (sometimes transcribed Tsing Shan) or Pui To Shan is a 583-metre (1,913-feet)-high peak in western New Territories, Hong Kong.

In contrast to its Chinese name, which means green hill, Castle Peak is notorious for its severe loss of vegetation and weathering of its granite surface.

Geography 

The area to the west of the hill is an industrial area with two power plants owned by CLP (Castle Peak Power Station and Black Point Power Station). It is also the old name of Tuen Mun during early British rule before starting development of Tuen Mun New Town. In early proposal of the development, the new town was named Castle Peak New Town.

Castle Peak is unique in that it is among the few prominent mountains in Hong Kong which are not inside a country park.

Castle Peak Hinterland

Firing Range 
Most areas north of the mountain and west of the mountain are commonly known as the Castle Peak Hinterland. Much of this large rocky hinterland is a designated firing range used by the People's Liberation Army and police forces in Hong Kong, and is named the "Tsing Shan Firing Range". Warnings are issued to the public before live military exercises are carried out. Sometimes the Firing Range is open to the public, but before venturing into the restricted areas, it is best to confirm the days on which the hinterland firing range is open to the public by searching for "firing range" in the Hong Kong Government press release website. The press releases concerning the firing range for any given month is typically released one week prior to the start of that month. Generally speaking, Saturdays, Sundays and Public Holidays are open days.

There are many hills that are considered sub-peaks of Castle Peak within this hinterland. Mountains Kon Shan and Por Lo Shan are frequently visited by hikers because the area's terrain has been compared to that of the Grand Canyon in the US, but on a smaller scale.

The summit of Castle Peak is not part of the Hinterland and is accessible daily, some of the routes leading up to the summit, namely from the north and west, may be closed because of military exercises on select days.

History
The name Pui To Shan was associated with a Buddhist monk Pui To Sim Shi. In Cantonese, Pui means "cup", To means "water-crossing", Sim Shi means "Monk of Zen". Legend has it that the monk had travelled over water in a cup and finally reached the Castle Peak. He established a monastery on the hill, which became the present-day Tsing Shan Monastery.

Early records have indicated that the peak was an island once named Tuen Mun Island. Its former channel with Kau Keng Shan of an important sea route in South China. Defence structures were built on both hills.

See also

 
 Castle Peak Road

Kau Keng Shan
Three Sharp Peaks of Hong Kong
 List of mountains, peaks and hills in Hong Kong

References

Mountains, peaks and hills of Hong Kong